Sphenomorphus kinabaluensis  is a species of skink found in Malaysia.

References

kinabaluensis
Reptiles described in 1895
Taxa named by Edward Bartlett
Reptiles of Borneo